Events in the year 2023 in Liechtenstein.

Incumbents 

 Prince: Hans-Adam II
 Regent: Alois
 Prime Minister: Daniel Risch

Events 
Ongoing – COVID-19 pandemic in Liechtenstein

 29 January – 2023 Liechtenstein constitutional referendum: Voters in Liechtenstein reject a proposed ban on casinos. The proposal, which Prince Hans-Adam II opposed, was rejected by around 73 percent of voters.

See also 

 COVID-19 pandemic in Europe
 2023 in the European Union
 City states

References 

 
2020s in Liechtenstein
Years of the 21st century in Liechtenstein
Liechtenstein
Liechtenstein